Scat or SCAT may refer to:

Education
 School and College Ability Test also known as SCAT
 Shrewsbury College of Arts & Technology was previously referred to as SCAT
 Somerset College of Arts and Technology is referred to as SCAT

Games
 Scat (card game), a card game also known as Thirty-One
 S.C.A.T.: Special Cybernetic Attack Team, a video game for the Nintendo Entertainment System by Natsume

Music
 Scat singing, a kind of vocal improvisation common in jazz
 Scat Records, a record label
 Scatman John, a singer
 Scatman Crothers, U.S. musician and actor

Transportation
 SCAT Airlines, an airline based in Kazakhstan
 SCAT (automobile) an Italian automobile manufacturer
 Sarasota County Area Transit, a public transportation system in Florida
 Seoul Station City Airport Terminal, a city airport terminal at Seoul Station, Seoul for Incheon International Airport
 South Coast Area Transit, a public transportation system in California
 South Pacific Combat Air Transport Command, a joint command of U.S. forces in World War II
 Space Coast Area Transit, a public transportation system in Florida
 Suffolk County Accessible Transportation, a paratransit service serving Suffolk County, New York
 Sydney Coordinated Adaptive Traffic System, a traffic network operating system in Australia

Other
 Scat is an alternate term for feces, particularly of wild carnivores
Scatology, study of animal and human feces 
 Scatophilia, a sexual paraphilia involving feces 
 Scatophagidae, a family of fish
 Scanning Acoustic Tomography, a research process using focused sound
 Somerville Community Access Television, a local television station in Somerville, Massachusetts
 Special Crimes Action Team, a fictional police task force in BJ and the Bear
 Scat (novel), a novel for young adults written by Carl Hiaasen
 Social Change Assistance Trust, a South African non-profit organisation.
 SHARE Compiler-Assembler-Translator, early assembler for IBM 700/7000 series computers

See also
 Skat (disambiguation)